Poonam Pandey (born 11 March 1991) is an Indian model and actress. She debuted in Bollywood with the film Nasha in 2013.

Early life 
Pandey was born to a family from Kanpur. She began her career as a model. She became one of the top nine contestants of the Gladrags Manhunt and Megamodel Contest and appeared on the cover page of the fashion magazine.

Media spotlight
Pandey became popular through her social media accounts, including Twitter when she started posting her semi-nude photos. Her revealing photos have received much media attention.

She rose to media spotlight when she promised to strip for the Indian cricket team if it won the 2011 Cricket World Cup. India indeed lifted the World Cup; however, Pandey did not fulfill her promise due to public disapproval, but later claimed she was denied permission by the Board of Control for Cricket in India (BCCI). However, she did upload a video on her mobile app, where she is seen stripping naked at the Wankhede Stadium at night.

In 2012, she posed nude after Kolkata Knight Riders won the IPL 5.

She went on to have her own mobile application developed. The app was banned by Google soon after its launch in the Play Store and currently available in her official site only.

She also uploaded a sex tape in which she was with her then boyfriend, on to Instagram that she later deleted.

Movie career
In 2013, she played the female lead of the film Nasha, playing a teacher who ends up having a sexual relationship with one of her students. While Rediff stated that she excelled as a seductress in the role, the Mumbai Mirror said she did "not play seductresses but a proper, responsible drama teacher" and that "Poonam makes an effort but isn't quite there".

The posters for the film, which featured her "clad in nothing, but two placards tactfully placed to cover her body", angered people and a group of protesters tore the posters and set them on fire on 20 July 2013 in Mumbai. The general secretary of Shiv Sena Chitrapat objected to advertisements, saying, "We find the poster highly vulgar and derogatory and won't allow such hoardings."

Pandey signed on to star in the planned sequel to Nasha, where she will be reprising her role as Anita.

Personal life 
Pandey married her long-term boyfriend Sam Bombay on 1 September 2020. The wedding had to be private because of the COVID-19 pandemic. They were married at their Mumbai home in the presence of close friends and family.  On 11 September, Pandey filed a complaint against Bombay claiming he had molested, threatened and assaulted her. Bombay was arrested on Tuesday 23 September in Goa, The incident happened in Canacona village in south Goa where Pandey was shooting for a movie. However this sparked a controversy as many accused her of scamming and abusing the use of IPC Section 498A.  Bombay was later released on bail and Pandey talked things over with him.  Due to the sudden patch up just a few days after the incident and Bombay's arrest, many claimed and trolled her on social media that the whole incident was a publicity stunt.  On 5 November 2020, Pandey was arrested in North Goa for filming a nude video on government property.  The arrest came after the Goa Forward Party filed a complaint and FIR, and stated to the media that Pandey's video was an assault on the women of Goa.   On 18 January 2022, she was given protection from arrest by the Supreme Court of India, after being accused of involvement in the major porn film racketing controversy scandal, that involved many Bollywood stars.

Filmography

Films

Television

References

External links

 

Female models from Mumbai
Living people
Indian film actresses
Actresses from Mumbai
Actresses in Hindi cinema
1991 births
21st-century Indian actresses
Actresses in Telugu cinema
Actresses in Hindi television
Fear Factor: Khatron Ke Khiladi participants
Sex scandals